Charles VI (1 October 1685 – 20 October 1740) was Holy Roman Emperor and ruler of the Austrian Habsburg monarchy from 1711 until his death, succeeding his elder brother, Joseph I. He unsuccessfully claimed the throne of Spain following the death of his relative, Charles II. In 1708, he married Elisabeth Christine of Brunswick-Wolfenbüttel, by whom he had his four children: Leopold Johann (who died in infancy), Maria Theresa (the last direct Habsburg sovereign), Maria Anna (Governess of the Austrian Netherlands), and Maria Amalia (who also died in infancy).

Four years before the birth of Maria Theresa, faced with his lack of male heirs, Charles provided for a male-line succession failure with the Pragmatic Sanction of 1713. The Emperor favoured his own daughters over those of his elder brother and predecessor, Joseph I, in the succession, ignoring the decree he had signed during the reign of his father, Leopold I. Charles sought the other European powers' approval. They demanded significant terms, among which were that Austria close the Ostend Company. In total, Great Britain, France, Saxony-Poland, the Dutch Republic, Spain, Venice, States of the Church, Prussia, Russia, Denmark, Savoy-Sardinia, Bavaria, and the Diet of the Holy Roman Empire recognised the sanction. France, Spain, Saxony-Poland, Bavaria and Prussia later reneged. Charles died in 1740, sparking the War of the Austrian Succession, which plagued his successor, Maria Theresa, for eight years.

Biography

Early years
Archduke Charles (baptized Carolus Franciscus Josephus Wenceslaus Balthasar Johannes Antonius Ignatius), the second son of the Emperor Leopold I and of his third wife, Princess Eleonore Magdalene of Neuburg, was born on 1 October 1685.

Following the death of Charles II of Spain, in 1700, without any direct heir, Charles declared himself King of Spain—both were members of the House of Habsburg. The ensuing War of the Spanish Succession, which pitted France's candidate, Philip, Duke of Anjou, Louis XIV of France's grandson, against Austria's Charles, lasted for almost 14 years. The Kingdom of Portugal, Kingdom of England, Scotland, Ireland and the majority of the Holy Roman Empire endorsed Charles's candidature. Charles III, as he was known, disembarked in his kingdom in 1705, and stayed there for six years, only being able to exercise his rule in Catalonia, until the death of his brother, Joseph I, Holy Roman Emperor; he returned to Vienna to assume the imperial crown. Not wanting to see Austria and Spain in personal union again, the new Kingdom of Great Britain withdrew its support from the Austrian coalition, and the war culminated with the Treaties of Utrecht and Rastatt three years later. The former, ratified in 1713, recognised Philip as King of Spain; however, the Kingdom of Naples, the Duchy of Milan, the Austrian Netherlands and the Kingdom of Sardinia – all previously possessions of the Spanish—were ceded to Austria. To prevent a union of Spain and France, Philip was forced to renounce his right to succeed his grandfather's throne. Charles was extremely discontented at the loss of Spain, and as a result, he mimicked the staid Spanish Habsburg court ceremonial, adopting the dress of a Spanish monarch, which, according to British historian Edward Crankshaw, consisted of "a black doublet and hose, black shoes and scarlet stockings".

Charles's father and his advisors went about arranging a marriage for him. Their eyes fell upon Elisabeth Christine of Brunswick-Wolfenbüttel, the eldest child of Louis Rudolph, Duke of Brunswick-Wolfenbüttel. She was held to be strikingly beautiful by her contemporaries.

Succession to the Habsburg dominions

When Charles succeeded his brother in 1711, he was the last male Habsburg heir in the direct line. Since Habsburg possessions were subject to Salic law, barring women from inheriting in their own right, his own lack of a male heir meant they would be divided on his death. The Pragmatic Sanction of 19 April 1713 abolished male-only succession in all Habsburg realms and declared their lands indivisible, although Hungary only approved it in 1723.

Charles had three daughters, Maria Theresa (1717–1780), Maria Anna (1718–1744) and Maria Amalia (1724–1730) but no surviving sons. When Maria Theresa was born, he disinherited his nieces and the daughters of his elder brother Joseph, Maria Josepha and Maria Amalia. It was this act that undermined the chances of a smooth succession and obliged Charles to spend the rest of his reign seeking to ensure enforcement of the Sanction from other European powers.

Charles agreed to a demand from Britain that he close a trading company, (the Ostend Company), which was based in the Austrian Netherlands and that he himself founded in 1722.

Other signatories included Britain, France, the Dutch Republic, Spain, Russia, Denmark and Savoy-Sardinia but subsequent events underlined Eugene of Savoy's comment that the best guarantee was a powerful army and full Treasury. His nieces were married to the rulers of Saxony and Bavaria, both of whom ultimately refused to be bound by the decision of the Imperial Diet and despite publicly agreeing to the Pragmatic Sanction in 1735, France signed a secret treaty with Bavaria in 1738 promising to back the 'just claims' of Charles Albert of Bavaria.

In the first part of his reign, the empire continued to expand; success in the Austro-Turkish War (1716–1718), adding Banat to Hungary, and establishing direct Austrian rule over Serbia and Oltenia (Lesser Wallachia). This extended Austrian rule to the lower Danube.

The War of the Quadruple Alliance (1718–1720) followed. It too ended in an Austrian victory; by the Treaty of The Hague (1720), Charles swapped Sardinia, which went to the Duke of Savoy, Victor Amadeus, for Sicily, the largest island in the Mediterranean, which was harder to defend than Sardinia. The treaty also recognised Philip V of Spain's younger son, Don Carlos (the future Charles III of Spain), as heir to the Duchy of Parma and Grand Duchy of Tuscany; Charles had previously endorsed the succession of the incumbent Grand Duke's daughter, Anna Maria Luisa, Electress Palatine.

Peace in Europe was shattered by the War of the Polish Succession (1733–1738),  a dispute over the throne of Poland between Augustus of Saxony, the previous King's elder son, and Stanisław Leszczyński. Austria supported the former, France the latter; thus, a war broke out. By the Treaty of Vienna (1738), Augustus ascended the throne, but Charles had to give the Kingdom of Naples to Don Carlos, in exchange for the much smaller Duchy of Parma.

The issue of Charles's elder daughter's marriage was raised early in her childhood. She was first betrothed to Léopold Clément of Lorraine, who was supposed to come to Vienna and meet Maria Theresa. Instead, he died of smallpox in 1723, which upset Maria Theresa. Léopold Clément's younger brother, Francis Stephen, then came to Vienna to replace him. Charles considered other possibilities (such as Don Carlos) before announcing the engagement to Francis. At the end of the War of the Polish Succession, France demanded that Francis surrender the Duchy of Lorraine (his hereditary domain), to Stanisław Leszczyński, the deposed King of Poland, who would bequeath it to France at his death. Charles compelled Francis to renounce his rights to Lorraine and told him: "No renunciation, no archduchess."

In 1737, the Emperor embarked on another Turkish War in alliance with Russia. Unlike the previous Austro-Turkish War, it ended in a decisive Austrian defeat. Much of the territory gained in 1718 (except for the Banat) was lost. Popular discontent at the costly war reigned in Vienna; Francis of Lorraine, Maria Theresa's husband, was dubbed a French spy by the Viennese.

Death and legacy

At the time of Charles's death, the Habsburg lands were saturated in debt; the exchequer contained a mere 100,000 florins; and desertion was rife in Austria's sporadic army, spread across the Empire in small, ineffective barracks. Contemporaries expected that Hungary would wrench itself from the Habsburg yoke upon his death.

The Emperor, after a hunting trip across the Hungarian border in "a typical day in the wettest and coldest October in memory", fell seriously ill at the Favorita Palace, Vienna, and he died on 20 October 1740 in the Hofburg. In his Memoirs Voltaire wrote that Charles's death was caused by consuming a meal of death cap mushrooms. Charles's life opus, the Pragmatic Sanction, was ultimately in vain. Maria Theresa was forced to resort to arms to defend her inheritance from the coalition of Prussia, Bavaria, France, Spain, Saxony and Poland—all party to the sanction—who assaulted the Austrian frontier weeks after her father's death. During the ensuing War of the Austrian Succession, Maria Theresa saved her crown and most of her territory but lost the mineral-rich Duchy of Silesia to Prussia and the Duchy of Parma to Spain.

Several recent authors have claimed that Charles had a number of sexual relationships with male courtiers, including his Master of the Horse, Prince Schwarzenberg, and a hunter's boy. The love of his life was Michael Joseph, Count Althann, a groom of the bedchamber, whom he called "my only heart, my comfort...my soul mate", and with whom he slept regularly. Althann's death in 1722, after a friendship of nineteen years, devastated him.

Emperor Charles VI has been the main motif of many collectors' coins and medals.  One of the most recent samples is high value collectors' coin the Austrian Göttweig Abbey commemorative coin, minted on 11 October 2006. His portrait can be seen in the foreground of the reverse of the coin.

Children

Heraldry

Ancestors

Notes

References
 Crankshaw, Edward: Maria Theresa, 1969, Longman publishers, Great Britain (pre-dates ISBN)
 Jones, Colin: The Great Nation: France from Louis XV to Napoleon, University of Columbia Press, Great Britain, 2002, 
 Fraser, Antonia: Love and Louis XIV: The Women in the Life of The Sun King, Orion books, London, 2006, 
 Mahan, J.Alexander: Maria Theresa of Austria, Crowell publishers, New York, 1932 (pre-dates ISBN)
 Kahn, Robert A.: A History of the Habsburg Empire, 1526–1918, University of California Press, California, 1992, 
 Acton, Harold: The Last Medici, Macmillan, London, 1980, 
 Browning, Reed: The War of the Austrian Succession, Palgrave Macmillan, 1995,

External links

Regnal titles

|-

|-

|-

|-

 
1685 births
1740 deaths
18th-century Holy Roman Emperors
18th-century Aragonese monarchs
18th-century archdukes of Austria
18th-century kings of Sardinia
18th-century Kings of Sicily
18th-century monarchs of Naples
Nobility from Vienna
Burials at the Imperial Crypt
Burials at St. Stephen's Cathedral, Vienna
Crown of Aragon
Knights of the Golden Fleece
Deaths from food poisoning
Grand Masters of the Order of the Golden Fleece
Pretenders to the Spanish throne
Dukes of Carniola
Sons of emperors
Children of Leopold I, Holy Roman Emperor
LGBT royalty